Sir Michael Cameron St John Birt, KC (born 25 August 1948) was the 88th Bailiff of Jersey in the Channel Islands.

Birt was educated in Jersey at St. Michael's Preparatory School then at Marlborough College. He went on to read law at Magdalene College, Cambridge. He was called to the English Bar in 1970 and practised as a barrister at 2 Crown Office Row for five years. He returned to Jersey and qualified at the Jersey Bar in 1977.

He was sworn in as an advocate of the Royal Court on 3 October 1977.  From 1976 to 1993 he was in private practice with the Jersey law firm Ogier & Le Cornu. In January 1994 he was appointed as HM Attorney General for Jersey. In February 2000, he became Deputy Bailiff. 

In July 2009, he was appointed Bailiff, in succession to Sir Philip Bailhache.

A group of protesters demonstrated outside Birt's swearing-in ceremony in the Royal Court of Jersey, angry about decisions not to bring more prosecutions following investigations into child abuse in Jersey.

As Bailiff of Jersey, Birt was an ex officio member of the Jersey Court of Appeal. In December 2013, Sir Michael announced he would retire as Bailiff of Jersey in January 2015.

Honours

Birt was appointed a QC learned in the law of Jersey in 1995. He was knighted in the 2012 Birthday Honours for services to the Crown and the community in Jersey.

References

External links 

 Official biography 
 Profile on Guernsey Society website

Bailiffs of Jersey
Jersey lawyers
Knights Bachelor
Living people
Lawyers awarded knighthoods
1948 births
Place of birth missing (living people)